Cold Comfort is the fifth studio album by the Dutch gothic metal band Autumn, released on 8 November 2011.

Track listing

References 

2011 albums
Autumn (band) albums
Metal Blade Records albums